In swimming, the term short course (abbreviated SC) is used to identify a pool that is  in length. The term is also often included in meet names when conducted in a short course pool. "Short course" is the second type of pool configuration currently recognized by FINA and other swimming bodies for pool competition; the other/primary pool length being "long course", where the pool is 50 meters in length. Olympic and the World Aquatics Championships are conducted in a long-course pool.

In the United States, the term "short course" is more commonly applied to  competition, which is more common in that country. Short-course yards is generally abbreviated as "SCY" to differentiate it from short course meters (SCM). The US national federations, USA Swimming and U.S. Masters Swimming, both maintain SCY USA records, FINA does not currently recognize records set in SCY, but does recognize/keep SCM records. USA college (including NCAA competition) and high school swimming are traditionally swum in SCY.

Short-course meter competitions are also denoted by listing of the actual meter distance: "25m" (in swimming, a space is not placed between the number and the m for meter).

Short-course records are traditionally faster than long-course records for the same distance. This is assumed to be connected to the increased number of wall push-offs, where swimmers can get powerful leverage from the wall.

See also
 FINA World Swimming Championships (25 m)

References

Swimming